Maano Ditshupo (born 20 January 1985) is a Motswana midfielder playing for Township Rollers in the Botswana Premier League. He is a full Botswana international, having made six appearances for the Zebras.

Considered one of Botswana's best talents of all time, Ditshupo started playing football at a very young age and was part of a team called Elden Brothers which included players living in the same ward as him. He made his professional debut with Maun Terrors and later moved to Satmos. He played only one season for the Selibe-Phikwe giants before they loaned him to Northern Irish club Lisburn Distillery when he went to visit his sister in Northern Ireland. Upon returning to Botswana Ditshupo joined Botswana Premier League giants Extension Gunners and truly became a household name, winning one FA Cup and earning his first national team cap.

During his stay at the Peleng club he greatly impressed Township Rollers, who signed him in 2012. With them he would win five Premier Leagues and one Mascom Top 8 Cup. Given the captain's armband in 2015, Ditshupo led Rollers to four successive league titles, a cup and a historic CAF Champions League group stage appearance. He is considered one of Rollers'greatest ever captains.

International career
Ditshupo made his Botswana debut on 4 August 2010 in an international friendly against Zimbabwe, which Botswana win 2-0.

Honours

Club
 Extension Gunners
FA Cup:1
2011

 Township Rollers
Botswana Premier League:5
2013-14, 2015-16, 2016-17, 2017-18, 2018-19
Mascom Top 8 Cup:1
2017-18

Individual
Mascom Top 8 Cup Top Goalscorer: 2016
 Mascom Top 8 Cup Player of the Tournament: 2016, 2018
FUB Team of the Year: 2016, 2017

References

1985 births
Living people
Botswana international footballers
Association football midfielders
Botswana footballers
Township Rollers F.C. players
Extension Gunners FC players